Mount Sion may refer to :
 an alternate spelling of Mount Zion in Jerusalem
 Mount Sion, Waterford, Ireland
 Mount Sion GAA, a Gaelic Athletic Association club 
 Mount Sion Primary School

See also